Gerald Clawson (10 November 1917 – 14 February 2001) was a Canadian swimmer. He competed in the men's 200 metre breaststroke at the 1936 Summer Olympics.

References

External links
 

1917 births
2001 deaths
Canadian male breaststroke swimmers
Olympic swimmers of Canada
Swimmers at the 1936 Summer Olympics
Swimmers from Toronto